Grozdanov is a surname. Notable people with the surname include: 

Branimir Grozdanov (born 1994), Bulgarian volleyball player
Cvetan Grozdanov (1936–2018), Macedonian art historian
Kire Grozdanov (born 1970), Macedonian football player
Kiril Grozdanov (born 1997), Bulgarian football player
Plamen Grozdanov (born 1950), Bulgarian diplomat
Stefan Grozdanov (born 1946), Bulgarian football player and manager
Tihomir Grozdanov (born 1987), Bulgarian tennis player
Zhivko Grozdanov (born 1995), Bulgarian football player